Clay High School is a public high school located in South Bend, Indiana. It is the Fine Arts school in the South Bend Community School Corporation magnet program.

Notable alumni 
 Jaraan Cornell – basketball player
 Jon Gruden – NFL head coach and professional football broadcaster
 Lee Nailon – professional basketball player, NBA player and 2007 Israeli Basketball Premier League MVP
 John Newcomer – game designer
 Dean Norris – actor
 Don Schlundt – basketball player
 David Simkins – screenwriter and television producer

See also
 List of high schools in Indiana

References

External links
 

Educational institutions established in 1939
Schools in St. Joseph County, Indiana
Magnet schools in Indiana
Public high schools in Indiana
1939 establishments in Indiana